Bernard Lefort (29 July 1922 – 19 January 1999), was a French lyric baritone, and later an opera director.

Biography 

He then began a career as a baritone, mainly in French mélodies (Germaine Tailleferre composed for him her , for baritone and orchestra in 1956), but also in operetta and opera (he performed in the mid-1950s au Théâtre du Châtelet and at the Paris Opera). He stopped singing for health reasons in the late 1950s.

He then became Artistic Director of the Lausanne Festival, then directed the Opéra de Marseille from 1965 to 1968.

References

External links 
 Bernard Lefort on Forum Opera

Singers from Paris
French operatic baritones
Opera managers
Directors of the Paris Opera
1922 births
1999 deaths
20th-century French male opera singers
Commandeurs of the Ordre des Arts et des Lettres